The common sunstar is a species of sea star (aka starfish) belonging to the family Solasteridae. It is found in the northern parts of both the Atlantic and the Pacific Oceans.

Distribution 
The common sunstar is distributed from the Arctic down to the English Channel, in the North Sea, also on both East (from the Arctic to the Gulf of Maine) and Pacific coasts (from Alaska to Puget Sound) of North America. It is also circumboreal, found in Greenland, Iceland, the Barents Sea, Kola Bay, Okhotsk Sea and the White Sea.

Habitat 
The common sunstar is commonly found on rocky bottoms, coarse sand and gravel in the bathyal, infralittoral and circalittoral zone (from low-tide line up to depths of 300 m). It seems to prefer areas of high water movement. Very small sunstars are sometimes found in rock pools.

Description 
It is reddish on top with concentric bands of white, pink, yellow, or dark red, and it is white on the underside. It is covered on top with brushlike spines, with the marginal spines somewhat larger. The thick, central disc is fairly large. This central disc has a netlike pattern of raised ridges. The mouth area is bare. It has relatively short arms which usually number eight to fourteen. Its radius can be up to 15 cm (6 inches). The madreporite plate stands out clearly.

Food 
The common sunstar is an omnivore. It will eat almost anything including smaller starfish and sunstars, swallowing them whole. It is also a scavenger.

References

 World Register of Marine Species : Mah, C.; Hansson, H. (2009). Crossaster papposus (Linnaeus, 1776). In: Mah, C.L. (2009). World Asteroidea database. Accessed through: World Register of Marine Species at on 2010-06-12
 Hansson, H.G. (2001). Echinodermata, in: Costello, M.J. et al. (Ed.) (2001). European register of marine species: a check-list of the marine species in Europe and a bibliography of guides to their identification. Collection Patrimoines Naturels, 50: pp. 336–351 
 Clark, A.M. and M.E. Downey. (1992). Starfishes of the Atlantic. Chapman & Hall Identification Guides, 3. Chapman & Hall: London, UK.

External links 
 Catalog of Life entry
 National Center for Biotechnology Information search
 

Solasteridae
Animals described in 1776
Taxa named by Carl Linnaeus